Bjarni Benediktsson may refer to:
 Bjarni Benediktsson (born 1908), Prime Minister of Iceland from 1963 to 1970
 Bjarni Benediktsson (born 1970), Prime Minister of Iceland in 2017 and current Minister of Economic Affairs